Parkside Middle School may refer to

 Parkside Middle School, Bromsgrove
 Parkside Middle School, Cramlington